The Play-offs of the 2010 Fed Cup Asia/Oceania Zone Group II were the final stages of the Group II Zonal Competition involving teams from Asia and Oceania. Using the positions determined in their pools, the nine teams faced off to determine their placing in the 2010 Fed Cup Asia/Oceania Zone Group II. The top team advanced to Group I for the next year.

Promotion play-offs
The first placed teams of each pool were placed against each other in a head-to-head round. The winner of the round advanced to Group I for 2011.

India vs. Kyrgyzstan

Third to Fourth play-offs
The second-placed teams from each pool were drawn in head-to-head rounds to find the third and fourth placed teams.

Malaysia vs. Hong Kong

Fifth to Sixth play-offs
The third-placed teams from each pool were drawn in head-to-head rounds to find the fifth and sixth placed teams.

Singapore vs. Philippines

Seventh
As there was only three teams from Pool A as opposed to the four from Pool B, the last-placed team from Pool B had no equivalent to play against. Thus the Syrians were automatically allocated seventh place.

Final Placements

  advanced to the 2011 Fed Cup Asia/Oceania Zone Group I, where they placed last overall and thus was relegated back to Group II for 2012.

See also
Fed Cup structure

References

External links
 Fed Cup website

2010 Fed Cup Asia/Oceania Zone